II Kultepe is an ancient settlement in Nakhchivan which was the center of one of the first city-states in Azerbaijan. The city was founded 3,500 years ago.

This triangle shaped residence, is located in the area where Chehrichay (Chehri river) and Nakhchivanchay (Nakhchivan river) connects. The first layer of the 7-10 thickness of the II Kültepe dates back to the Early Bronze Age. The remains of circular shaped buildings built of bricks were discovered during the research. The results of the radiocarbon (C 14) analysis show that 3500–2400 years. The thickness of this medieval layer of this multilayered monument is more than 4 meters. This is In the II millennium, it consists of four construction stages, covering the lives and lives of Kultepe residents. Protective walls were built around the place of residence. Along with the remains of residential buildings, economic buildings, industrial buildings, the large-scale painted containers, stone, bone and bronze tools, ornaments, weapons was revealed.

Residents of Kultepe, who are familiar with the perfect construction technique, use raw materials such as bricks, masks and stones. The defense fortress built here, the living and farm buildings, is a product of a high architectural pleasure and creates a great idea of the construction work of the era. The compound-built defense fortress has been further strengthened with quadrangular constellations.

II Kultepe has both monochrome and polychrome clay pots. They are different in shape. The patterns on the clay pots are rich. In addition to geometric patterns, there are also plot illustrations that express certain meanings. The ruins of the quadrangular building were uncovered on the III section of the II Kultepe. The floors of buildings constructed mainly from raw bricks are soil and stone. Studies confirm that the II Kultepe was one of the urban-type settlements of the Middle Bronze Age. II Kultepe covers 3 ha of living space. The residence is surrounded by magnificent fortress walls. Its third part is surrounded by constellations and defensive walls with supports. The castle wall with a width of 2 m is enclosed on a mud-mounted stonework. Large square bricks were used in the construction of the wall (32x32x11 cm; 38x38x12 cm; 40x40x12 cm; 44x44x12 cm).  Shortly after that, the castle wall is exposed to debris and loses its protective value. But after a while it is restored, but the area is significantly reduced. In the eastern and southern part of the tower, a new one is being built instead of an old wall. Residential and commercial buildings are flattened and made of mud hardened stones. Some houses are a few rooms. Strong and suddenly flaming fire destroyed buildings, an old man's bones were found in the remains of fire. During the Middle Bronze Age, four construction layers and more than 4 m cultural layers in Kültepe, create an idea of the longevity of living here. There are plenty of different material from the place of residence. The stone grass found here has been used in various fields. Most likely, their elegant samples were applied as weapons.

The pottery neighborhood in Kultepe settlement, the stone and street stoves of the stone flooring were discovered. It is known that various types of simple and painted dishes made of stone tools such as grinding stone, grass stone, teeth, grain residues, pets, metal goods, clay bush for metal splitting, partially chopped. Although the embroidery consists mostly of geometric shapes, human, bird and animal images are also found.

References

Categories 

Archaeological sites in Azerbaijan
Kura-Araxes culture
Cultural history of Azerbaijan
Bronze Age Asia
Bronze Age sites in Asia